Basudev is a South Asian given name and surname. Notable people with the name include:

Basudev Chatterji (1949–2017), historian, writer and professor of History at the University of Delhi
C. Basudev, 20th century Indian labour unionist

Asian given names
Surnames of Asian origin